María Eugenia Rodríguez Noguera is a pageant titleholder, was born in Maracay, Venezuela in 1973. She is the Miss Venezuela International titleholder for 1992, and was the official representative of Venezuela to the Miss International 1992 pageant held in Tokyo, Japan, when she classified in the Top 15 semifinalists.

Rodríguez competed in the national beauty pageant Miss Venezuela 1992 and obtained the title of Miss Venezuela International. She represented the Portuguesa state.

References

External links
Miss Venezuela Official Website
Miss International Official Website

1973 births
Living people
People from Maracay
Miss Venezuela International winners
Miss International 1992 delegates